Andrée Yanacopoulo is a Quebec doctor, writer, translator, teacher and sociologist born in Tunis, Tunisia, on November 14, 1927. She was the partner of Hubert Aquin from 1963 to 1977 with whom she had a son Emmanuel Aquin.

Biography 

She studied medicine at the University of Lyon, France, and also holds a master's degree in sociology. She settled in Quebec in 1960. From 1961 to 1964, she was a professor of sociology at the Université de Montréal. She then taught at Collège Sainte-Marie and the Université du Québec à Montréal until 1973, then at the Cégep de Saint-Laurent until 1989.

In parallel, she co-directs with Nicole Brossard for six years the Délire collection at Parti Pris editions and holds several other positions with different publishers.

She wrote a book titled Signé Hubert Aquin: Surcule sur suicide d'écrivain (Signed Hubert Aquin: investigation on the suicide of a writer), after the death of his spouse. She is editor for her publishing house Vanishing Point.

Publications 
 In the name of the Father, the Son and Duplessis, 1984
 Signed Hubert Aquin - investigation of a writer's suicide (in collaboration with Gordon Sheppard), 1985
 Suzanne Lamy, 1990
 Hans Selye or the Cathedral of Stress, 1992
 Discovery of multiple sclerosis. The nosographic reason, 1997
 "The Regroupement des Femmes Québécoises", 2003
 Henri F. Ellenberger. A life, 2009
 Simone Monet-Chartrand and Michel: A committed couple, written in collaboration with Paul Labonne, 2010
 Take note, Boreal, 2013.

Awards 

 Finalist for the Governor General's Award for essay category (1993)

Translations 
 How to love living alone, Lynn Shanan ("Living alone and liking it!"), 1982
 The Memory, Elizabeth Loftus ("Memory"), 1983

References 

1927 births
Living people
People from Tunis
University of Lyon alumni
Academic staff of the Université de Montréal
Academic staff of the Université du Québec à Montréal
Writers from Quebec
Canadian women non-fiction writers
20th-century Canadian non-fiction writers
21st-century Canadian non-fiction writers
Canadian non-fiction writers in French
Tunisian emigrants to Canada
20th-century Canadian women writers
21st-century Canadian women writers
Tunisian expatriates in France